Annunciation is a 1600 painting by El Greco, now in the São Paulo Museum of Art in Brazil.

Bibliography
  ÁLVAREZ LOPERA, José, El Greco, Madrid, Arlanza, 2005, Biblioteca «Descubrir el Arte», (colección «Grandes maestros»). .
  SCHOLZ-HÄNSEL, Michael, El Greco, Colonia, Taschen, 2003. .

References

1600 paintings
El Greco
Paintings by El Greco